Released on May 28, 2002, this DVD chronicles The Morning View Sessions concert that the band Incubus gave in New York City.

Track listing
 "Program Start"
 "Pardon Me"
 "Stellar"
 "Glass"
 "Circles"
 "The Warmth"
 "Mexico"
 "Drive"
 "Warning"
 "New Skin"
 "Just a Phase"
 "Nice to Know You"
 "Wish You Were Here"
 "End Credits"

Special features
 "Wish You Were Here" (Original Cut)
 The Making of "Wish You Were Here"
 Living on Morning View
 Introducing The House
 Early Jamming On 11 A.M.
 Jose in "Where's My Shorts?"
 Picking Rooms
 Sunset Timelapse
 Incubus Goes Bananas
 Wish You Were Here
 Circles Jam
 Red Room Trip
 Dirk's Zen
 Cribs
 Pool
 Blood on the Ground
 Storytelling Practice
 Drive
 Warning
 Kid Kilmore & The Milkman
 Spinning

Incubus (band) video albums
2002 live albums
Live video albums
2002 video albums
Epic Records live albums
Epic Records video albums
Immortal Records video albums
Immortal Records live albums